The Pededze is a river in Latvia and Estonia. It flows generally south. It is a right tributary of the Aiviekste, the source of Pededze is Lake Kirikumäe in the Haanja Uplands in Vastseliina Parish, Võru County, Estonia. The basin area of Pededze is 1,690 km2 (1,523.3 km2 in Latvia; 119 km2 in Estonia) and average discharge 12.2 m³/s. Pededze together with Aiviekste forms natural and historical border between Vidzeme and Latgale.

References

Rivers of Latvia
Rivers of Estonia
International rivers of Europe